The High Sheriff of Fermanagh is the Sovereign's judicial representative in County Fermanagh. Initially an office for lifetime, assigned by the Sovereign, the High Sheriff became annually appointed from the Provisions of Oxford in 1258. Besides his judicial importance, he has ceremonial and administrative functions and executes High Court Writs.

History
The first (High) Shrivalties were established before the Norman Conquest in 1066 and date back to Saxon times. In 1908, an Order in Council made the Lord-Lieutenant the Sovereign's prime representative in a county and reduced the High Sheriff's precedence. Despite however that the office retains his responsibilities for the preservation of law and order in a county.

While the office of High Sheriff ceased to exist in those Irish counties, which had formed the Irish Free State in 1922, it is still present in the counties of Northern Ireland.

High Sheriffs of County Fermanagh

17th century

18th century

19th century

20th century

21st century

References

Sources
 List of Fermanagh High Sheriffs 1606–1865

 
Fermanagh
History of County Fermanagh